The British Overseas Territory of Bermuda has a long history of encounters with Atlantic tropical cyclones, many of which inflicted significant damage and influenced the territory's development. The islands are situated far outside the main development region for Atlantic hurricanes, but within the typical belt of recurving tropical cyclones. Most storms form in the central Atlantic or western Caribbean Sea before approaching Bermuda from the southwest; storms forming north of 28°N are unlikely to impact the territory.

According to the Bermuda Weather Service, the islands of Bermuda experience a damaging tropical cyclone once every six to seven years, on average. Due to the small area of the island chain, landfalls and direct hits are rare. Strictly speaking, only ten landfalls have occurred during years included in the official Atlantic hurricane database, starting in 1851. When hurricanes Fay and Gonzalo struck Bermuda just days apart in October 2014, that season became the first to produce two landfalls. Two damaging storms impacted Bermuda in September 1899, but the center of the first storm narrowly missed the islands. Tropical cyclones, and their antecedent or remnant weather systems, have affected the territory in all seasons, most frequently in the late summer months. A study of recorded storms from 1609 to 1996 found that direct hits from hurricanes were most common in early September and late October, with an intervening relative lull creating two distinct 'seasons'.

Hurricanes late in the year are often in the process of undergoing extratropical transition and receiving baroclinic enhancement. Bermuda is less likely to be impacted during years when the Caribbean, Gulf of Mexico, and southeastern United States are favored targets. Even in intense hurricanes, the islands tend to fare relatively well; ever since a cyclone in 1712 destroyed many wooden buildings, most structures have been built with stone walls and roofs, and are able to withstand severe winds. As a result, hurricane-related deaths have been uncommon since the early 18th century. Ten storms have collectively caused 129 fatalities; 110 of them, or 85%, were the result of shipwrecks along the shore in Hurricane "Ten" of 1926. Hurricane Fabian in 2003 was the only system in the weather satellite era to cause storm-related deaths.

In total, 191 distinct storm events are listed, with widely varying degrees of damage. A hurricane in 1609 was responsible for the first permanent settlement on Bermuda: in late July, the Jamestown-bound, British ship Sea Venture nearly foundered in the storm and sought refuge on the islands, which the passengers found surprisingly hospitable. Hurricane Fabian was the most intense storm to impact the territory in modern times, though officially it did not make landfall, and was the only storm to have its name retired for effects in Bermuda. The costliest storms were Fabian and Gonzalo, which caused about $300 million and $200–400 million in damage respectively (2003 and 2014 USD). Accounting for inflation and continued development, Fabian would have likely wrought around $650 million in damage had it struck in 2014. The most recent tropical cyclone to seriously affect the islands was Hurricane Paulette in September 2020.

List of storms

1543–1799
1543 – The year 1543 and indistinct initials are carved on a rock in the modern-day Spittal Pond Nature Reserve, likely by the occupants of a Portuguese vessel that became separated from her fleet and driven aground in the summer months. Thirty sailors survive on Bermuda for about 60 days, during which time they construct a seaworthy craft from recovered timbers of their wrecked ship. Given the time of year, a tropical hurricane may be responsible for this incident.
July 24, 1609 – A hurricane sets the stage for the British colonization of Bermuda when a ship bound for Jamestown, Virginia, is caught in the storm and forced to steer aground. When a fleet of Virginia Company ships tasked with resupplying the failing Jamestown colony encounters the hurricane, the flagship, Sea Venture, becomes separated from the other vessels and begins to take on water. The increasingly waterlogged Sea Venture battles the rough seas until July 28, when, just as the crew becomes resigned to their fate, Admiral Sir George Somers spots the uninhabited rocky shores of Bermuda. To prevent the ship from sinking, Somers deliberately drives her onto the reefs about a half mile off the eastern coast. Using the ship's longboat, all 150 settlers, as well as the crew, make it safely ashore. The so-called "Isle of Devils" proves far more hospitable than initially feared, with abundant food and resources. Two new ships, the Deliverance and the Patience, are constructed, and nearly all of the Sea Venture's original occupants set sail for Jamestown. The Virginia Company administers the islands until the formation of the Somers Isles Company in 1615. The tale of the Sea Venture inspired William Shakespeare to write The Tempest, and the coat of arms of Bermuda features a prominent representation of the shipwreck.
July (?) 1612 – A hurricane destroys a recently constructed church.
September 1615 – A severe hurricane strikes Bermuda 
November 1619 – Two hurricanes strike Bermuda during the month, sinking at least one ship, the Warwick, uprooting large trees, ruining the entire winter corn crop, and destroying a wooden watchtower constructed seven years earlier. The rapid succession of two hurricanes leaves the colony with a severe food shortage.
1620 – A hurricane flattens hastily built shacks, while two fishermen are lost at sea.
September 13, 1621 – The arrival of a supply ship into port is delayed by stormy conditions; by the time the vessel wrecks along the coast, some of her passengers have died of a rampant illness.
August 16, 1629 – The most damaging hurricane thus far in the colony's history destroys crops, several forts, a prison, and the rebuilt watchtower.
October 20, 1639 – Two Spanish ships ground out in a hurricane; the occupants are brought ashore, and charged monthly accommodation fees until their departure the following February. The sailors claim that the Governor had prevented them from leaving the colony except by means of purchasing their own ship.
October 16, 1664 – A British ship blows aground in the midst of a storm.
1686 – Hurricane season leaves the Government House in a state of disrepair.

1700–1799
September 8, 1712 – A severe hurricane buffets Bermuda for eight hours, destroying most of the churches. The storm highlights the necessity of ongoing efforts to shift from wood construction to stone.
1713 – By November, the effects of two hurricanes are evident, though the collective impact is less severe than that of the 1712 hurricane.
1715 – A disastrous hurricane destroys the rest of the wooden churches left standing after the 1712 hurricane.
1726 – A season of stormy weather includes two hurricane strikes in rapid succession. Private and public buildings alike are damaged by the hurricanes, and the persistent bad weather leads to a stream of stricken ships entering St. George's Harbour for repairs. Without the support of the Somers Isles Company, which was dissolved in 1684, impoverished colonists grow disillusioned; they are often unable to repair storm-related damage, the crops in 1726 are a complete loss, and the small supply of gunpowder is compromised.
1728 – The newly appointed Governor of Bermuda, John Pitt, arrives to find the island in distress from a recent hurricane impact. The official residence requires repair once more.
October 18, 1780 – After emerging from the Lesser Antilles, where it establishes itself as the deadliest Atlantic hurricane on record, the Great Hurricane of 1780 devastates Bermuda, likely passing southeast of the islands. Some fifty ships are driven ashore with the storm surge, and vast swaths of trees are uprooted; the town of St. George's is left with a "completely denuded air." Many homes are demolished. Famine and a smallpox epidemic take hold in the aftermath of the hurricane.
September 1786 – Houses are damaged and trees are uprooted by a hurricane, and the cotton crop is largely destroyed.
October 23, 1793 – A violent hurricane passes near the islands, causing "inconceivable" damage to homes and public buildings, many of them being totally destroyed. The storm topples several thousand trees and wreaks havoc on shipping; every vessel in St. George's Harbour is driven aground, many ships being wrecked or heavily damaged, and numerous wharves are lost. Most of the 40 or so fish ponds along the north shore of St. David's Island, with a cumulative capacity of about 5,000 fish, are destroyed.

1800–1849
September 9–10, 1800 – The sloop John founders amid rough seas from a tropical storm or hurricane; her entire crew is rescued. Bermuda is subjected to a period of gales but suffers no damage.
November 4–5, 1800 – A hurricane brings strong winds to the islands, "destroying every shrub in its direction." Damage to trees and crops is substantial, and multiple vessels are driven ashore. This hurricane prompts a change in attitude toward the need for a lighthouse in Bermuda, and the establishment of a Marine Society is sought to aid families of sailors lost along the rocky coasts.
August 4–5, 1813 – Prior to this storm, St. George's Harbour becomes congested with numerous warships and detained merchant ships due to a war between Great Britain and the United States. There are violent collisions between vessels in the crowded harbour; nearly every ship is driven ashore or wrecked. Untold quantities of cargo are lost, with little to salvage. Despite the damage, only one life is lost, aboard the ketch General Doyle. In the storm's wake, construction begins on a new breakwater.
October 15–19, 1814 – A hurricane strikes the islands "head-on," with persistent gale-force winds. Roads are clogged with debris and some homes are flooded, though damage is generally minor.
1815 – A slow-moving hurricane on an unspecified date batters the islands, altering the configuration of the coastline.
August 1818 – A hurricane unroofs the Town Hall building on Front Street in the City of Hamilton.
September 19, 1828 – A hurricane to the northwest produces gale-force winds.
June 6–7, 1832 – The center of a tropical cyclone passes over or very close to the islands. Two schooners in St. George's Harbour are driven aground, and several houses are partially or totally unroofed. Tree damage is extensive.
September 11–12, 1839 – One of the worst storms in Bermuda's history strikes the islands from the south with an exceptional  storm surge. Boats along the southern shore are carried ashore and deposited in fields, while various species of fish are seen hundreds of yards inland. Hurricane-force winds uproot many thousands of trees and level numerous homes; few structures escape damage. Roadways are left impassable by debris from trees, walls, and fences. Many families are left homeless, some forced to abandon their homes in the middle of the night and endure the storm in the open. Sea spray renders nearly all residential wells brackish. Despite the destruction, no lives are reported lost.  The storm is typically known as Reid's Hurricane, after the newly appointed Bermuda Governor William Reid who studied and documented Atlantic hurricanes with great interest.
October 21, 1841 – Hurricane-force winds from a nearby cyclone destroy a couple houses and damage several more, as well as destroying trees and food crops. Potato plants are left "as black and withered as if destroyed by a severe frost."
October 8–9, 1842 – Winds increase to Force 9 as a hurricane passes to the north.
August 18, 1843 – A distant hurricane is felt in the form of gusty winds.
October 27, 1845 – The islands experience gale-force winds from a tropical cyclone to the east.
September 17–18, 1846 – Squally weather and pounding surf indicate the passage of a hurricane to the south and west. Aside from damage to trees, no major destruction is reported.
October 15, 1848 – Violent winds and tides  from a nearby hurricane batter the islands. Many wharves are submerged or entirely washed away, while stone walls and part of a breakwater collapse from the force of the surge. Roadways and homes in Flatts Village are also flooded.

1850–1899
September 6–8, 1853 – The outer fringes of a major hurricane are felt in the islands, but no damage is reported.
September 26–27, 1853 – A tropical cyclone to the east produces gale-force winds and heavy rainfall.
October 21, 1854 – A tropical storm passes a short distance to the southeast with Force 11 winds. "Great" property damage is reported, particularly at Spanish Point, and numerous boats are destroyed. Observers witness two possible tornadoes: one that passes over Boaz Island, scouring the ground, and another in eastern Paget Parish that topples trees and unroofs a home.
October 23–24, 1858 – The center of a moderate hurricane passes near the islands with powerful winds and flooding tides. The storm damages many homes and churches, and uproots a large number of trees.
October 4, 1866 – Force 11 winds are reported on the outer fringes of a distant hurricane. Buildings sustain roof and wall damage, trees are toppled, and several boats are damaged or wrecked.
September 10, 1870 – A major hurricane to the northwest blows down a large number of banana trees.

September 5, 1874 – A hurricane to the west generates huge swells as sea spray defoliates plants across the territory.
October 20–23, 1876 – Gale-force winds and heavy rainfall mark the passage of a hurricane to the north.
August 27–28, 1878 – Streets are clogged with fallen trees as a hurricane passes to the north. At the height of a storm, a floating dry dock—the largest ever built at the time—is damaged after breaking from its moorings at HM Dockyard, crushing wharves and a mooring bridge. The dock came to rest on a breakwater.

Intense winds cause "vast" damage to buildings and vegetation, particularly in eastern parts of the islands. A newly built school is destroyed in Smith's Parish, and the Causeway sustains significant damage. Several ships are driven aground, and dozens of smaller boats are wrecked. Fruit crops are a total loss.
October 14, 1880 – Blustery squalls are reported along the fringe of a hurricane to the southeast.
August 28, 1891 – Heavy squalls and winds to Force 6 indicate the passage of a hurricane to the east. The storm damages trees, telegraph wires, and stone walls.
September 19–22, 1891 – A slow-moving Category 2 hurricane approaches from the east and recurves just before the islands. High winds bring down trees and utility wires, and a Spanish brig loaded with lumber wrecks along the southwestern shore.
October 4, 1891 – A moderate hurricane to the west produces a prolonged period of strong winds and heavy rain, but no appreciable damage is reported.
October 17–18, 1891 – A hurricane passes a short distance to the west with extremely high tides and pounding waves. The Causeway is extensively damaged.
August 19–20, 1892 – Though winds are relatively light, a hurricane to the west causes some agricultural, structural, and maritime damage.
October 15, 1892 – Winds just below hurricane force are recorded at the Gibbs Hill Lighthouse as a hurricane passes to the east.
October 26, 1894 – A fast-moving hurricane to the west delivers a brief period of hurricane-force winds, toppling trees and telephone poles. The storm blows down roofing material and ruins vegetable crops.
Dozens of telephone poles are snapped, while "enormous" trees are uprooted. Extensive damage befalls homes, businesses, and public buildings.
September 4, 1899 – A Category 1 hurricane passes just to the northwest, producing hurricane-force winds and significant damage.
September 12–13, 1899 – The distinct eye of a Category 3 hurricane tracks over Bermuda with severe damage reported in many areas. As residents are preoccupied with cleanup efforts from the previous storm, the hurricane catches the islands off-guard. Houses are unroofed or completely destroyed, and large boulders along the southern shore are tossed inland. Wharves and boats are wrecked. HM Dockyard in particular takes heavy losses, amounting to "at least five figures" (GBP). St. George's Parish is cut off from the mainland after the Causeway is demolished by strong waves, at a cost of around £15,000. The hurricane also extensively damages crops and vegetation, dealing a major blow to farmers. Early estimates place total property damage at £100,000, and this storm remains the strongest on record to impact the islands until Hurricane Ten of 1926.

1900s
September 17, 1900 – Strong winds from a hurricane to the east cause little damage.
September 28, 1903 – A Category 2 hurricane passing a short distance to the east causes significant damage. Winds of  uproot large numbers of trees, while heavy rainfall washes out roadways. Along the coast, docks, seawalls, and boats are destroyed; hundreds of buildings throughout the islands are damaged. Two fatalities are attributed to the storm: one man drowns at Ireland Island, and another is crushed by a collapsing wall in St. George's.
September 8–9, 1906 – A major hurricane to the northwest brushes the islands with  winds, blowing down roof slates, telephone wires, and trees. One man drowns after being blown off Watford Bridge, and another fatality occurs in Hamilton Harbour as a sailboat capsizes in a severe squall. A ferry in the harbour is destroyed by fire, which briefly threatens to spread to land.
October 13, 1909 – A dissipating tropical storm produces strong winds.

1910s

September 25, 1910 – A moderate hurricane to the east damages buildings in St. George's, topples a few banana trees, and blows a ship aground. Heavy rains provide residents with many months of clean drinking water.
September 3–8, 1915 – A Category 3 hurricane meanders around the islands for several days, during which time gale-force winds blow from nearly all directions. Heavy rains cause many roofs to leak, and overall damage is extensive. Enormous waves from the hurricane wreck many boats; one cargo ship in particular, the SS Pollockshields, is driven aground on a reef off Elbow Beach. The captain drowns while attempting to procure a life jacket for a crew member, but all other men are eventually rescued.
September 23, 1916 – A major hurricane just to the west brings winds of at least . The storm, considered the most severe in many years, damages most structures, with several being nearly or completely destroyed. Exposed buildings along Front Street in Hamilton bear the brunt of the hurricane. Numerous small boats in Hamilton Harbour are wrecked.
September 4, 1917 – Enormous waves and extremely high tides from a major hurricane to the east inundate low-lying areas, including the entirety of Market Square in St. George's; individuals at Town Hall become stranded by the rising waters. A large section of Higgs' Island is swept away.
September 4–5, 1918 – The center of a Category 2 hurricane passes narrowly to the west, sinking or grounding boats and flooding parts of the islands. Winds of at least  topple trees and shatter windows.

1920s
September 15, 1921 – A high-end Category 2 hurricane inflicts severe damage on trees, public utilities, and small boats while striking the island. Many buildings – including several hotels – suffer damage, mostly of a minor nature. Water wells become contaminated by the sea spray.
September 21, 1922 – Bermuda is struck by a Category 3 hurricane and associated  storm surge, resulting in the highest tide since 1899; an hour-long lull attends the passage of the eye. The hurricane submerges homes, roads, wharves, and other coastal installations, while  waves break along the south shore. Winds reaching  ravage vegetation, particularly banana trees. Heavy structural damage is also reported throughout the territory, and a number of small houses on White's Island are blown into the water. Total damage is estimated at $250,000, and one fatality occurs when a sailor falls overboard at the Dockyard.

Parts of St. George's are inundated with seawater, and cottages on St. David's Island are damaged. The storm brings down trees, tree branches, and powerlines.
A few small boats in harbour are swamped.
October 22, 1926 – A Category 3 hurricane makes landfall, becoming tied with Hurricane Five of 1899 for the strongest recorded storm to strike the territory. The second half of the cyclone is the more violent, with sustained winds of  measured at Prospect Camp, whereupon the Army takes down its anemometer to protect it. Conditions at the Royal Naval Dockyard prevent its personnel from taking its anemometer down; it measures  at 13:00 UTC, before the wind destroys it. Damage is widespread but not extreme; although 40% of Bermuda's houses sustain roof damage, only two are destroyed. The storm destroys banana plantations and fields of other crops. Another ship, the cargo steamer SS Eastway, is lost near Bermuda along with 22 of her 35 crew members.

1930s
The slow-moving storm delays the arrival of ships into port.
October 6, 1933 – A hurricane passes to the northwest, delivering gale-force winds.
August 23, 1935 – A Category 3 hurricane narrowly misses to the northwest, with relatively light winds reported.
June 17, 1936 – The season's first tropical storm produces gusty winds while passing just to the north.
Boats, homes, and vegetation all suffer considerable damage.

1940s
September 28, 1942 – A tropical storm curves around Bermuda with marginal tropical storm-force winds.
August 24, 1943 – A major hurricane passes to the west, delivering a period of hurricane-force winds to Bermuda.
September 3–4, 1943 – Winds to  accompany the outer fringes of a hurricane to the east.
October 1, 1943 – A tropical storm curves to the west, producing gusty winds.
October 16–17, 1943 – A weakening hurricane to the west causes gale-force winds.

The hurricane cuts electric and telephone services, and numerous boats are sunk, including a ferry outside Hamilton Harbour. Homes are unroofed and trees are blown down, while ten people are slightly injured. Preliminary estimates place damage at $1 million. In the aftermath of the storm, a lineman is killed after falling from a pole during service restoration efforts.
Roadways are clogged with various debris, and St. George's is cut off from the mainland. Meanwhile, some buildings are deroofed. Rainfall totaling nearly  triggers street flooding.
The storm uproots thousands of trees and leaves the entire territory without power. Many buildings suffered roof or wall damage; total losses are estimated at $1 million.
A few tree limbs are broken.

1950s
 September 8, 1950 – Winds near  mark the approach of Hurricane Dog from the southwest.
 September 9, 1951 – As Hurricane Easy passes to the southeast, gusty winds blow down several banana trees.
 September 27, 1952 – Hurricane Charlie passes to the northwest, resulting in a period of tropical storm-force winds.
 September 5, 1953 – Winds near  accompany the outer bands of Hurricane Carol to the southwest. The squalls knock down tree limbs and powerlines and injure two motorcyclists, while two motorcyclists in Hamilton are injured after being blown off-balance.
 September 11–12, 1953 – Tropical Storm Dolly makes landfall, but the weakening storm causes little damage. Gale-force winds and moderate rainfall disrupt telephone service.
The winds cause significant damage to homes and trees, and some freshwater flooding is reported. Edna also wreaks havoc on boats in Hamilton Harbour and disrupts water and power utilities across Bermuda. Three people sustain storm-related injuries.
 September 28, 1958 – Hurricane Ilsa to the east causes squally conditions and extensive beach erosion.

1960s
August 9, 1963 – Category 1 Hurricane Arlene makes landfall and produces torrential rain totaling . Gusts to  cause extensive tree damage, enabled by a dearth of recent storms, and further foliage is killed by the sea spray. Heavy losses are reported to citrus and avocado crops. Arlene destroys homes and watercraft, and a yacht club in Devonshire Parish is "wiped out in its entirety including every boat." Property damage is estimated at $300,000.
August 8, 1964 – Tropical Storm Brenda makes landfall, spawning a tornado that damages several airplanes. A  wind gust recorded by an elevated anemometer is attributed to the tornado.

Power and telephone services are interrupted on St. George's, and the Causeway experiences overwash.
July 20–21, 1966 – Hurricane Celia to the west douses Bermuda with heavy but beneficial rain.
August 31 – September 2, 1966 – The outer bands of Hurricane Faith produce heavy rainfall and gusty winds.
October 5, 1969 – Strong winds from Hurricane Inga to the southeast cause brief power outages.

1970s
October 16, 1970 – An unnamed Category 1 hurricane skirts just to the west, with wind gusts as high as  measured by an elevated anemometer.
September 23, 1971 – A long-duration wind event marks the passage of Hurricane Ginger to the south.
Despite blowing down a few trees and powerlines, the storm proved beneficial, helping to alleviate persistent drought conditions.
September 9, 1977 – Light rainfall accumulations are reported in association with Tropical Storm Clara.
October 14, 1977 – Tropical Storm Evelyn makes landfall, but the strongest part of the storm remains offshore; Bermuda experiences  of rain and only light winds.
October 11, 1978 – The remnants of Tropical Storm Juliet combine with a non-tropical storm system to produce moderate rains.

1980s
September 8, 1981 – Hurricane Floyd weakens to a tropical storm and passes just southeast, placing Bermuda on the weaker side of the cyclone. The encounter yields only brief rain showers.
September 30, 1984 – The center of Tropical Storm Hortense passes a few miles to the west, with no significant effects.
Some households lose electricity for several days.
August 12, 1985 – Tropical Storm Claudette to the north causes gusty winds and light rainfall.
September 25, 1987 – After a bout of unexpected and rapid intensification, fast-moving Hurricane Emily makes landfall at Category 1 intensity, battering the island with a brief burst of destructive winds. The storm's outer bands spawn "dozens" of waterspouts and tornadoes, some of which cause injuries and property damage. Boats, cars, and utilities also suffer. Of 2,500 houses impacted by the storm, about 200 receive major roof damage. All roads on the island are obstructed by toppled trees and utility poles. Losses are estimated at $35 million, and over 100 people are treated for minor storm-related injuries.
August 6, 1989 – The eastern eyewall of Category 2 Hurricane Dean crosses the island. The storm damages at least 648 buildings, along with dozens of boats and vehicles, and sixteen people are injured to some degree. Storm-heightened tides flood coastal streets and homes, while several inches of rain are measured. A parking lot at the airport is totally washed out along with several vehicles. Naval Air Station Bermuda sustains $3.9 million in damage, contributing to a storm total of $8.9 million.
September 7, 1989 – Large waves from distant Hurricane Gabrielle erode beaches on the south shore.

1990s

October 11, 1990 – Hurricane Lili passes to the south, resulting in squally weather.
October 20, 1990 – Tropical Storm Nana meanders to the south, dropping  of rain.
September 8, 1991 – Hurricane Claudette recurves to the east, yielding breezy rainshowers.
Grace later contributes to the formation of the well-known 1991 Perfect Storm.
October 22, 1994 – Hurricane Chris passes to the southeast, producing  of rain.
The slow-moving storm cuts power to about 18,000 electric customers, delays an independence referendum, and causes $2.5 million in damage. Rough seas break boats from their moorings and destroy long swaths of the Causeway's safety walls. Two other bridges in St. George's receive damage.
No appreciable damage is reported.
October 20, 1996 – Hurricane Lili passes to the southeast, buffeting the island with gusty winds.
Above-average tides and  waves leave significant beach erosion and affect an estimated 1,100 buildings, while 10,000 homes lose power.

2000–2005

October 15, 2000 – The precursor disturbance to Hurricane Michael drops several inches of rain.
August 25, 2001 – The remnants of Tropical Storm Dean induce inclement weather.
September 10, 2001 – Gusty winds from Hurricane Erin to the northeast damage trees and powerlines.
September 17, 2001 – Hurricane Gabrielle passes to the northwest, attended by showers and thunderstorms.
The storm system destroys numerous boats and leaves some 23,000 households without power, accounting for more than two-thirds of electric customers.
November 7, 2001 – The combination of Hurricane Michelle's extratropical remnants and a developing non-tropical low bring rainy and blustery weather.
November 26 – December 3, 2001 – The tight pressure gradient between distant Hurricane Olga to the east and high pressure to the northwest generates a prolonged period of winds near or above gale force. As Olga moves slowly and erratically southwestward, the effects of its outer reaches include  of rain on December 3 and  swells.
August 9, 2002 – The remnants of Tropical Storm Cristobal interact with a cold front to produce squally conditions.
September 7–9, 2002 – Subtropical Storm Gustav develops to the southwest, delivering persistent clouds and showers.
October 1–2, 2002 – As Tropical Storm Kyle slowly passes to the south, its outer bands drop half of Bermuda's monthly precipitation total for October.
April 18–21, 2003 – Subtropical Storm Ana develops west of Bermuda before slowly looping around to the south as a fully tropical cyclone. The island experiences gusty winds and heavy showers.

September 5, 2003 – The island enters the eastern eyewall of Category 3 Hurricane Fabian, the most destructive hurricane in the territory since 1926. Seawater inundates beachfront structures and compromises the Causeway, where four people are swept away in their vehicles. Fabian produces considerable damage to property and vegetation, unroofing some buildings in exposed locations and causing more severe failures in weaker structures. The wind damage is perhaps exacerbated by several small tornadoes reportedly embedded in the hurricane's eyewall. About 25,000 electric customers lose power, and total damage exceeds $300 million. Fabian is the only tropical cyclone in the weather satellite era to directly cause fatalities on Bermuda. In response to the hurricane's destruction, the name Fabian is retired and replaced with Fred for 2009.
September 27, 2003 – Hurricane Juan's passage to the east is marked by gusty winds.
The system causes minor power outages.
The heavy rainfall creates some short-lived street flooding.
October 25, 2005 – Thunderstorms and gusty winds are observed as Hurricane Wilma passes far to the northwest. The hurricane disrupts the flight path of migratory birds, resulting in an unusual increase in frigatebird sightings.

2006–2010
The winds bring down trees and powerlines, leaving 25,000 households without power, and damage about ten buildings. A small tornado is reported in Southmapton Parish within one of the hurricane's outer bands. Overall damage amounts to $200,000.
November 2–3, 2007 – As Hurricane Noel far to the west transitions into a large extratropical cyclone, Bermuda experiences rough seas and gale-force winds.
September 27–28, 2008 – Tropical Storm Kyle to the west intensifies into a hurricane, brushing the island with gusty winds and heavy showers.
August 21, 2009 – Hurricane Bill passes to the west, causing squally conditions and high swells that reach  just outside the reefs. The storm unmoors several boats, erodes beaches, and briefly cuts power to a few thousand customers.

August 7–8, 2010 – Tropical Storm Colin approaches from the south with building seas, but dissipates before reaching the island. The dissipating system produces squally conditions.
September 4, 2010 – The island experiences inclement weather from the remnants of Tropical Storm Fiona.
Igor also produces  of rain and a minor storm surge. Igor causes less destruction than feared, leading to only minor structural damage and coastal flooding, but still cuts power to nearly 29,000 households. The storm causes an estimated $500,000 in damage.
October 29, 2010 – Category 1 Hurricane Shary, an unusually small storm, passes  to the southeast with no major effects.

2011–2015
October 1, 2011 – Hurricane Ophelia passes to the east. High surf and some breezy showers are reported.
The storm impairs several boats around the island.
September 8–10, 2012 – Slow-moving Tropical Storm Leslie to the east drops  of rain, most of which falls on September 9, the island's wettest day in several years; only minor flooding is reported. Gusty winds cause limited power outages, chiefly from powerline contact with overhanging vegetation.
October 16–17, 2012 – Hurricane Rafael passes to the east, delivering gusty winds and moderate rainfall. About 1,000 electric customers lose power for a short time.
October 27–29, 2012 – Outer bands from the expansive Hurricane Sandy to the west affect Bermuda.
A few trees and tree limbs are blown down.
August 27–28, 2014 – Hurricane Cristobal passes far to the northwest, with its effects limited to gusty winds and heightened surf.

October 12, 2014 – Category 1 Hurricane Fay makes landfall in Bermuda, causing an unexpectedly great degree of damage. Wind gusts over  clog roadways with downed trees and utility poles, and leave most electric customers without power. Along the coast, Fay damages or destroys numerous boats and inundates streets. The terminal building at the airport suffers extensive flooding after the powerful winds compromise its roof and sprinkler system. Insured losses from Fay likely total "tens of millions of dollars."
October 17–18, 2014 – While cleanup and repairs from Fay are still underway, Category 2 Hurricane Gonzalo makes landfall on the southwestern coast, severely compounding the damage. At the height of the storm, about 31,000 out of 36,000 electricity customers are without power, including 1,500 residual outages from Fay. The hurricane destroys many boats and inflicts minor damage on Causeway, limiting traffic to one lane for several days. Trees and utility poles once again leave "barely a road passable" across the island, and the Bermuda Weather Service building endures wind and water damage. The most significant storm to affect Bermuda since Fabian in 2003, Gonzalo is generally less destructive, and causes no deaths or major injuries. Insured losses are estimated at between $200 and $400 million.
A structure at the Bermuda Maritime Museum is partially unroofed, and about 15,000 households lose electricity, but damage is generally inconsequential.

2016–present

January 8, 2016 – The extratropical cyclone that would later become Hurricane Alex generates rough seas and  wind gusts. Along with sporadic power outages, air travel and ferry services are interrupted.
Heavy rainfall, totaling , contributes to Bermuda's wettest September on record, while tropical storm-force winds cut power to about 800 electric customers.
October 13, 2016 – The eye of Category 3 Hurricane Nicole passes over the islands, though the exact center remains just offshore. Gusts as high as  blow down trees and power lines, which cuts power to nearly 90% of the territory. Dozens of boats are damaged or destroyed, and entire fields of crops are lost, although property damage is less severe than anticipated. The hurricane drops  of rain, becoming one of the wettest recorded tropical cyclones to impact Bermuda. Total damage is estimated at $15 million.
August 3–4, 2017 – Showers and thunderstorms accompany the extratropical remnants of Tropical Storm Emily as they sweep over the islands.
July 9, 2018 – Moderate showers signal the arrival of atmospheric instability and moisture from Tropical Storm Chris to the southwest.
July 13, 2018 – The extratropical remnants of Hurricane Beryl, passing between Bermuda and the United States, give rise to light rain and gusty winds.
Nearly 28,000 electric customers lose power, many roads are left impassable, and farmers report severe losses to fruit and vegetable crops. On the Bermuda Weather Service campus, a GOES-16 satellite receiving dish and weather balloon launching platform are destroyed, and weather radar service is cut near the height of the storm. Overall damage is estimated at $25 million. Because of effective preparations, Humberto causes no deaths or serious injuries.
September 24–25, 2019 – Around  of rain falls in advance of Hurricane Jerry's dwindling remnant low, which ultimately passes directly over the islands.
September 29 – October 1, 2019 – Clouds and light rain associated with Tropical Storm Karen linger for several days. Meanwhile, Horseshoe Bay is closed to swimmers because of dangerous swells from distant but powerful Hurricane Lorenzo.
July 4–5, 2020 — Moderate rainfall and some thunderstorms with tropical-storm force wind gusts occur as Tropical Depression Five (later Tropical Storm Edouard) passes 70 mi (110 km) to the north of the islands.
September 14–15, 2020 — Hurricane Paulette makes landfall on the northeastern part of the island as a Category 2 hurricane, bringing heavy wind, rain, and storm surge. Just under 70% of the island lost power and wind gusts reached . A direct hit to the island, the eye of the hurricane provided an unusual 3 hour respite from the strong winds.
June 6, 2022 — Tropical Storm Alex makes its closest approach to the island, remaining 220 miles away from the island. The outer bands of the storm caused strong winds and dropped 1-2 inches of rain on the island.

Monthly statistics and landfalls

Deadly storms
The following is a list of hurricanes with known deaths in the territory.

See also

Atlantic hurricane season
List of Atlantic hurricanes

References
Citations

General

External links

Bernews homepage
The Royal Gazette homepage
History of Bermuda from Bermuda Online
Bermuda Weather Service
United States National Hurricane Center

Bermuda